Merrill Edwin Barrington (February 25, 1920 – December 18, 1965) was a Canadian politician, accountant and insurance broker. He was elected to the House of Commons of Canada in 1958 as a Member of the Progressive Conservative Party for the riding of Châteauguay—Huntingdon—Laprairie. He was defeated in the elections of 1953, 1957 and 1962.

External links
 

1920 births
1965 deaths
Members of the House of Commons of Canada from Quebec
Progressive Conservative Party of Canada MPs
People from Montérégie
Canadian accountants
Anglophone Quebec people